The 1984 Int. ADAC-1000-km-Rennen was the fourth round of the 1984 World Endurance Championship. It took place at the Nürburgring, West Germany on 15 July 1984.

Official results
Class winners in bold. Cars failing to complete 75% of the winner's distance marked as Not Classified (NC).

Statistics 
 Pole Position - #2 Rothmans Porsche - 1:28.68
 Fastest Lap - #14 GTi Engineering - 1:32.75
 Average Speed -

References 

 

Nurburgring
Nurburgring
6 Hours of Nürburgring
Nurburgring